Mühl, Muehl,  is an occupational surname related to the occupation of miller and literally means "mill". Notable people with this surname include:

Charlotte Kemp Muhl (born 1987), American singer, songwriter, writer, model and film director
Edward Muhl (1907-2001), American businessman and executive
Erica Muhl (born 1961), American composer and conductor
Lars Muhl (born 1950), Danish writer, mystic and musician
Lukas Mühl (born 1997), German professional footballer
Nika Mühl (born 2001), Croatian basketball player
Otto Muehl (1925-2013), Austrian artist

See also
Von der Mühll

Germanic-language surnames
Occupational surnames